Campeonato Brasileiro 2004 may refer to:

Campeonato Brasileiro Série A 2004
Campeonato Brasileiro Série B 2004
Campeonato Brasileiro Série C 2004

See also 
 Campeonato Brasileiro (disambiguation)

pt:Campeonato Brasileiro de 2004